Intercon may refer to:

 Intercon Security, a Canadian security corporation
 Intercon LARP conventions, a series of live action role-playing game conventions
 InterCon Systems Corporation, a TCP/IP software manufacturer